César López Fretes (21 March 1923 – 13 July 2001) was a football striker from Paraguay.

López Fretes started his career at Atlántida Sport Club from Barrio Obrero and was later transferred to Olimpia Asunción. He was part of the Paraguay squad at the 1950 World Cup and was one of the goal scorers for Paraguay. He also played for Paraguay in the Copa América tournament.

After retiring, he became a coach and managed several teams in Paraguay and Colombia, where he is remembered by Atlético Nacional fans for the championship he led the team to in 1973. He also managed Deportivo Pereira and Unión Magdalena. López also coached the Colombia national football team and died in that country in 2001.

References

1923 births
2001 deaths
Paraguayan footballers
Paraguayan expatriate footballers
Paraguay international footballers
1950 FIFA World Cup players
Paraguayan Primera División players
Categoría Primera A players
Club Olimpia footballers
Deportivo Pereira footballers
Expatriate footballers in Colombia
Paraguayan football managers
Atlético Nacional managers
Colombia national football team managers
Deportivo Pereira managers
Association football forwards
Atlántida Sport Club players
Deportes Tolima managers